Bileća is a town and municipality located in Republika Srpska, an entity of Bosnia and Herzegovina. As of 2013, the town has a population of 7,476 inhabitants, while the municipality has 10,807 inhabitants.

History

The first traces of civilization in Bileća date from the Neolithic period, although archaeological sites are insufficiently explored.

During the Middle Ages, Bileća was located on the boundary of the župa of Vrm and the nearby Vlach necropolis was often mentioned as an important crossroad location for caravans on the way from Dubrovnik to Nikšić and Ključ, near Gacko. The town became part of the Bosnian state for the first time in 1373, after the defeat of Nikola Altomanović, but the first mention of the town under its present name is from 25 January 1387, while it appears as Bilechia in 1438. A document dated 8 September 1388 mentions that the army of the duke Vlatko Vuković defeated the Turkish army at the Battle of Bileća. The period from the 13th to the 16th century was marked by the building of a large number of stećci, monolith markers that weigh up to 5 tons.

Bileća was held by the Turks from 1466, although it was a rebellious area that was difficult to control. Nearby lies the town of Vučji Do, in which the Battle of Vučji Do took place in 1876. The Congress of Berlin included Bileća in the Austro-Hungarian Empire, which brought economic development to the region. The first primary school in Bileća was opened in 1880.

Settlements
Aside from the town of Bileća, the municipality includes the following settlements:

 Baljci
 Bijela Rudina
 Bijeljani
 Bodenik
 Bogdašići
 Brestice
 Čepelica
 Deleuša
 Divin
 Dlakoše
 Dola
 Donja Meka Gruda
 Donji Davidovići
 Đeče
 Fatnica
 Golobrđe
 Gornja Meka Gruda
 Gornji Davidovići
 Granica
 Hodžići
 Kačanj
 Kalac
 Korita
 Krivača
 Krstače
 Kukričje
 Kuti
 Lađevići
 Milavići
 Mirilovići
 Miruše
 Mrežica
 Narat
 Njeganovići
 Oblo Brdo
 Orah
 Orahovice
 Pađeni
 Panik
 Plana
 Podgorje
 Podosoje
 Preraca
 Prijevor
 Prisoje
 Rioca
 Selišta
 Simijova
 Skrobotno
 Šobadine
 Todorići
 Torič
 Trnovica
 Vlahinja
 Vranjska
 Vrbica
 Zasada
 Zaušje
 Zvijerina
 Žudojevići

Demographics

Population

Ethnic composition
According to the 1910 census, the absolute majority in the Bileća municipality were Orthodox Christians (82.27%). According to the Kingdom of Yugoslavia 1931 population census, the majority was held by Orthodox Christians 81.27%.

Economy

The following table gives a preview of total number of registered people employed in legal entities per their core activity (as of 2018):

Sports
Local football club FK Hercegovac has spent one season in the country's second tier-First League of the Republika Srpska.

Features
 The Diocese of Zahumlje-Herzegovina and Littoral (official site in Serbian), Serbian Orthodox Church (official site in English)
  Hydroelectric power plants on the Trebisnjica River (near Bileća)
 Lake Bileća (Bilećko jezero) is located south of the town.

Notable people

 Safet Isović, singer
 Beba Selimović, singer
 Fadil Hadžić,  movie director and writer
 Dušan Vukotić, Oscar for best animated short in 1961 for Surogat
 Karlo Mijić, painter
 Jevto Dedijer, writer
 Nenad Mišanović, basketball player
 Prokopije Čokorilo, priest
 Ervin Eleskovic, Swedish tennis player
 Tijana Bošković, Serbian volleyball player, World and European champion, silver medalist at the 2016 Summer Olympics

See also
 Municipalities of Republika Srpska

References

External links

 

 
Populated places in Bileća